"Solen lever kvar hos dig" is a song recorded by Norwegian singer Kamferdrops. The song was released as a digital download on 26 February 2018 and peaked at number 60 on the Swedish Singles Chart. It took part in Melodifestivalen 2018, and placed sixth in the first semi-final on 3 February 2018. It was written by Kamferdrops along with Herbert Trus, Danne Attlerud, Martin Klaman, Kristoffer Tømmerbakke, and Erik Smaaland.

Track listing

Charts

Release history

References

2018 singles
2017 songs
Swedish-language songs
Melodifestivalen songs of 2018
Norwegian pop songs
Universal Music Group singles